Women for Another Europe was a short-lived  electoral coalition in Greece.

The coalition was formed by small left-wing parties that participated in the Coalition of the Radical Left (Renewing Communist Ecological Left etc.), independent feminists, anti-war activists and independent left-wing activists.

The 24 candidates of the list were women, and in the 1st place was Nena Venetsanou, a singer and an active member of the campaign for women's rights.

In the European election, 2004 the coalition gained 0.76% and a few months later merged back into the Coalition of the Radical Left.

References

Defunct political party alliances in Greece
2004 establishments in Greece
Feminist parties in Europe
Feminism in Greece